Ex Ordo is cloud-based conference management software for association and academic conferences, congresses and symposia. Ex Ordo combines a core abstract management functionality with a registration system, scheduling software, and a mobile conference app. It is used by conferences in 58 countries across a wide set of research fields.

History
Ex Ordo was conceived in 2008 by Paul Killoran when he was still an engineering student at NUI Galway. While helping one of his lecturers organise a conference, Killoran recognised the need for academic conference chairs to have efficient tools to manage the research material submitted to their conferences. He built a basic abstract management system designed to facilitate the peer review process within scientific, technical and medical conferences. 

In 2011, Killoran incorporated Ex Ordo with co-founder Dermot Lally. 

Ex Ordo has since grown to become conference management software that includes delegate registration, conference scheduling and the ability to build a book of proceedings.

Services
Ex Ordo allows conference chairs to manage all stages of organising a research conference. This includes collecting submissions and managing their peer review, creating a set of proceedings and publishing a mobile conference app.

Peer reviewers use Ex Ordo to review submissions based on an online marking scheme stipulated by the conference chair.

Awards and recognition
Awarded Best New Web Application 2011 and Best Practice 2011 awarded by the Realex Fire Web Awards.

Named a Top 10 Abstract Management System for Academia by Event Industry News in 2016.

Ex Ordo is backed by Enterprise Ireland.

See also
 Abstract management
 Research or academic conferences
 Peer review
 Proceedings

References

External links
 
 The Conference Mentor

Academic conferences
Abstract management software